Roger Federer defeated Alexander Zverev in the final, 6–1, 6–3 to win the singles tennis title at the 2017 Halle Open. It was his ninth Halle title. He did not lose a single set in the entire tournament.

Florian Mayer was the defending champion, but lost to Federer in the quarterfinals.

Seeds

Draw

Finals

Top half

Bottom half

Qualifying

Seeds

Qualifiers

Lucky loser
  Yūichi Sugita

Qualifying draw

First qualifier

Second qualifier

Third qualifier

Fourth qualifier

References

 Main Draw
 Qualifying Draw

2017 Gerry Weber Open